This is a list of Belgian television related events from 1963.

Events
16 February - Jacques Raymond is selected to represent Belgium at the 1963 Eurovision Song Contest with his song "Waarom?". He is selected to be the eighth Belgian Eurovision entry during Eurosong.

Debuts

Television shows

Ending this year

Births
21 January - Goedele Liekens, psychologist & TV host
18 February - Marlène de Wouters, journalist, TV host & author
9 May - Guy Van Sande, actor

Deaths